María Cruz González Álvarez (born May 23, 1971 in Madrid) is a former female field hockey player from Spain. She represented her native country at the 1996 Olympic Games. She played club hockey for Real Club de Campo in Madrid.

External links
 
 
 

1971 births
Living people
Spanish female field hockey players
Olympic field hockey players of Spain
Field hockey players at the 1996 Summer Olympics
Field hockey players from Madrid